Simpel-Fonetik is a system of English-language spelling reform that simplifies the reading, writing, and pronunciation of words in English. It was created by Allan Kiisk, a multilingual (English, German, Latin, and Estonian) professor of engineering.

Based on phonetic languages including Estonian, Finnish, and Hawaiian, it removes common difficulties of learning to communicate in English by correlating one unique letter per sound and one sound per letter.

Description

Basic principles
Simpel-Fonetik writing is based on the following principles:

 Each letter represents only one spoken sound
 There is a letter for each basic sound in the English language
 Double letters (two adjacent identical letters) represent long vowels and strong consonants.

Alphabet
The Simpel-Fonetik alphabet is based on the Latin script, with the addition of three letters with diacritics: ä, ö, and ü (with umlaut). The alphabet does not include the letters c, q, x, or y, which are only used when writing unassimilated foreign terms or proper names.

The 25-letter alphabet is:

Example
The Star (H. G. Wells)

It was on the först dei of the nuu jiir thät the ännaunsment was meid, olmoust saimulteiniosli from thrii obsöörvatoris, thät the moushon of the plänet Neptune, thi autermoust of ool the plänets thät wiil öbaut the san, häd bikam veri erräätik. Ö retardeishon in its velossiti häd biin saspekted in Disember. Then ö feint, rimout spek of lait was diskaverd in the riidshon of the pörtöörbd plänet. Ät föörst this did not koos eni greit eksaitment. Saientifik piipl, hauever, faund the intelidshens rimaarkabl inaf iiven bifor it bikeim noun thät the nuu bodi was räpidli grouing laardsher änd braiter, änd thät its moushon was kwait different from the oorderli progres of the plänets.

See also 
English-language spelling reform

References

Further reading
Stanford Alumni News "Bad Spellers of the World, Untie"
Kiisk, Allan (2013) Simple Phonetic English Spelling - Introduction to Simpel-Fonetik, the Single-Sound-per-Letter Writing Method, in printed, audio and e-book versions, Tate Publishing, Mustang, Oklahoma.
Kiisk, Allan  (2012) Simpel-Fonetik Dictionary - For International Version of Writing in English, Tate Publishing, Mustang, Oklahoma.

External links
The English Spelling Society
English Spelling Reform Using Simpel-Fonetik Alphabet

Phonetic alphabets
English spelling reform